Love Lives Forever is the sixth studio album by American soul singer Minnie Riperton. Released posthumously in 1980, it was co-produced by her husband Richard Rudolph and released on her then-label Capitol Records. It consists of tracks Riperton recorded in 1978 during vocal sessions prior to her death, and music recorded after her early death, occurred on July 12, 1979.

Background
All of Riperton's vocals were stripped from earlier, original music tracks, and the backing tracks were completely redone. Completed with new musicians, vocalists and arrangements. Producer Quincy Jones described the project as "keeping the bridge, but moving the water".

The back cover of the vinyl album featured a quote about Riperton from each artist who participated, and their signature (a thumbprint for Stevie Wonder). Wonder's quote inspired the album title: "I miss you because I cannot touch you...but then again, I guess that I can because you're touching me...so, Love lives forever".

Commercial reception
The song "Here We Go" is a duet with R&B singer Peabo Bryson, released as a single and hit the top twenty. The single peaked at no. 14 on the Billboard R&B Songs chart and also features additional Roberta Flack vocals. The second song from the album released as a single was "Give Me Time," featuring Stevie Wonder on harmonica. The single peaked at no. 72 on the Billboard R&B Songs chart.

Track listing
Side One
"Here We Go" (Minnie Riperton, Richard Rudolph, Art Phillips) – 6:12
Peabo Bryson – vocals (duet) 
Roberta Flack – additional vocals
Tom Scott – tenor sax solo
"I'm in Love Again" (Riperton, Rudolph) – 4:05
Michael Jackson – additional vocals
Hubert Laws – flute solo
"Strange Affair" (Riperton, Rudolph, Marlo Henderson) – 8:55
Michael Boddicker – synthesizer

Side Two
"Island in the Sun" (Riperton, Rudolph) – 4:45
Tom Scott – tenor sax solo
"Give Me Time" (Leonard Caston, Jr., Lila Hurtado) – 4:25
Stevie Wonder – harmonica solo
Gerry Vinci – violin solo
"You Take My Breath Away" (Riperton, Rudolph, Randy Waldman) – 4:35
George Benson – additional vocals
"The Song of Life (La-La-La)" (Riperton, Rudolph, Caston, Weider) – 4:10
Patrice Rushen – vocals, electric piano

Personnel
Minnie Riperton - vocals
Michael Jackson, George Benson, Patrice Rushen, Peabo Bryson, Roberta Flack - additional vocals
Tennyson Stephens – acoustic piano
Patrice Rushen - electric piano
Greg Phillinganes – keyboards, synthesizers
Lee Ritenour, Paul Jackson Jr. – guitar
Gayle Levant – harp
Abraham Laboriel – bass
Harvey Mason – drums
Tom Scott - tenor saxophone
Hubert Laws - flute
Stevie Wonder - harmonica
Lenny Castro, Paulinho da Costa – percussion
Gerry Vinci – concertmaster
Maxine Waters, Julia Waters, Stephanie Spruill – backing vocals

Charts

Singles

References

1980 albums
Capitol Records albums
Minnie Riperton albums
Albums produced by Johnny Pate
Albums published posthumously